The China-LAC Cooperation Fund (abbreviated CLAC Fund) is a multilateral investment and financing cooperation fund established by the Chinese government. The CLAC Fund is divided into a US$2 billion co-financing facility and US$3 billion investment fund. Both the co-financing facility and fund support investments and projects in Latin America and the Caribbean.

It is one of three multilateral cooperation funds created by the Chinese government to advance the economic relationship between China and Latin America. The other two are Sino-Latin American Production Capacity Cooperation Investment Fund (China-LAC Industrial Cooperation Investment Fund) and the Special Loan Program for China-Latin America Infrastructure Project.

Investment fund
The initial scale of the investment fund is US$3 billion contributed by the Chinese government. The investment fund is administered by the Export-Import Bank of China. The fund has made investments in Brazil and Jamaica. In Brazil the fund was involved in the acquisition of a project from Duke Energy and an investment in Electrosul.

Co-financing fund
The co-financing fund is funded by a capital contribution of US$2 billion from the Chinese government. It is administered by the Inter-American Development Bank (IDB) to finance alongside lending by the IDB for projects in "education, water conservancy and energy, etc." in Latin America and the Caribbean.

References

Belt and Road Initiative
Private equity firms of China